Leucostethus argyrogaster is a species of frog in the family Dendrobatidae. It is endemic to Peru. Its natural habitats are subtropical or tropical moist lowland forests, subtropical or tropical moist montane forests, and rivers.

References

Leucostethus
Amphibians of Peru
Amphibians described in 1993
Taxonomy articles created by Polbot